Yves Dreyfus (17 May 1931 – 16 December 2021) was a French epee fencer who held two medals as part of the French Olympic épée team.

Life and career
Dreyfus was born in Clermont-Ferrand, France, and was Jewish. He survived the Nazi occupation of France as a child despite being Jewish by taking the name Yves Doucet.

Dreyfus was a three-time Olympian for France and won two bronze medals. At the 1956 Olympics in Melbourne at the age of 25 he won a bronze medal in team epee. At the 1960 Olympics in Rome at the age of 29 he came in 6th in individual epee and tied for 9th with the French epee team.  At the 1964 Olympics in Tokyo at the age of 33 he fenced in the individual epee and won a bronze medal in the team epee.

In 1964, he won the French national championship in epee. He won a gold medal in individual epee at the 1961 Maccabiah Games. He competed for France at the 1965 Maccabiah Games. He won gold medals in both individual epee and team epee at the 1977 Maccabiah Games.

In 1966, he was decorated by General Charles de Gaulle. In 1967, he was given the National Order of Merit by the French Council of Ministers. He later became a Master of Arms.

Dreyfus died on 16 December 2021, at the age of 90.

See also
List of select Jewish fencers

Further reading

References

External links
Jews in Sports bio
Jewish Olympic Medalists
List of Jewish Fencers

1931 births
2021 deaths
French male épée fencers
Jewish male épée fencers
Jewish French sportspeople
Olympic fencers of France
Fencers at the 1956 Summer Olympics
Fencers at the 1960 Summer Olympics
Fencers at the 1964 Summer Olympics
Olympic bronze medalists for France
Olympic medalists in fencing
Maccabiah Games medalists in fencing
Maccabiah Games gold medalists for France
Competitors at the 1961 Maccabiah Games
Competitors at the 1965 Maccabiah Games
Competitors at the 1977 Maccabiah Games
Medalists at the 1956 Summer Olympics
Medalists at the 1964 Summer Olympics
Sportspeople from Clermont-Ferrand